Ross William Ormiston was a New Zealand cricketer born on October 19, 1955, in New Plymouth. He played 56 first-class matches for Central Districts & Wellington without being selected for the Black Caps. In 1981–1982 he and Evan Gray added 226 for Wellington against Central Districts.

References

New Zealand cricketers
Central Districts cricketers
Wellington cricketers
Norfolk cricketers
1955 births
Living people
Cricketers from New Plymouth